André Lalande (19 July, 1867 Dijon – 15 November, 1964 Asnières) was a French philosopher. In 1904, he was appointed Professor of philosophy at the University of Paris.

Whilst still at school in 1883-4 he was taught by Émile Durkheim, whom he greatly appreciated. His notes have provided the basis for the publication Durkheim's Philosophy Lectures: Notes from the Lycée de Sens Course, 1883–1884 in 2004.

His doctoral thesis was entitled L'idée directrice de la dissolution opposée à celle de l'évolution. In 1901, he was one of the founders of the French Philosophical Society.

Works
 1893: Lectures sur la philosophic des sciences, Paris
 1899: L'idée directrice de la dissolution opposée à celle de l'évolution Paris (revised and reissued as Les illusions évolutionnistes, Paris, 1930)
 1899 Quid de Mathematica vel Rationali vel Naturali Senserit Baconus Verulamius, Paris, 1899 (in Latin)
 Précis raisonné de morale pratique, Paris: Hachette
 1929 Les théories de l'induction et de l'expérimentation, Paris: Boivin
 1948 La raison et les normes, Paris, 1948.
 1960 Vocabulaire technique et critique de la philosophic 8Paris: Presses Universitaires de France

References

1867 births
1964 deaths
19th-century essayists
19th-century French non-fiction writers
19th-century French philosophers
19th-century philosophers
20th-century essayists
20th-century French non-fiction writers
20th-century French philosophers
French male essayists
French male non-fiction writers
French male writers
Lecturers
Philosophers of education
Philosophers of language
Philosophers of mathematics
Philosophers of science
Philosophy academics
Philosophy writers